Leeville is an unincorporated community in Wilson County, in the U.S. state of Tennessee. It is centered just north of Interstate 40 and just west of Tennessee State Route 109.

History
Leeville was platted in 1871, and named after Robert E. Lee (1807–1870), American Civil War Confederate general. A post office called Leeville was established in 1877, and remained in operation until 1904. Variant names were Kellys and Stringtown.

References

Unincorporated communities in Tennessee
Unincorporated communities in Wilson County, Tennessee